The Codex Gigas ("Giant Book") is the largest extant medieval illuminated manuscript in the world, at a length of . Very large illuminated bibles were a typical feature of Romanesque monastic book production, but even within this group, the page-size of the Codex Gigas is noted as exceptional. The manuscript is also known as the Devil's Bible, due to its highly unusual full-page portrait of Satan, and the legend surrounding its creation.

The manuscript was created in the early 13th century in the Benedictine monastery of Podlažice in Bohemia, now a region in the modern-day Czech Republic. The manuscript contains the complete Vulgate Bible, as well as other popular works, all written in Latin. Between the Old and New Testaments are a selection of other popular medieval reference works: Josephus's Antiquities of the Jews and De bello iudaico, Isidore of Seville's encyclopedia Etymologiae, the chronicle of Cosmas of Prague (Chronica Boemorum), and medical works: an early version of the Ars medicinae compilation of treatises, and two books by Constantine the African.

Eventually finding its way to the imperial library of Rudolf II in Prague, the entire collection was taken as spoils of war by the Swedes in 1648 during the Thirty Years' War, and the manuscript is now preserved at the National Library of Sweden in Stockholm, where it is on display for the general public.

Description 

The codex's bookbinding is wooden boards covered in leather, with ornate metal guards and fittings. Weighing , Codex Gigas is composed of 310 leaves of vellum claimed to be made from the skins of 160 donkeys, or perhaps calfskin, covering  in total. The manuscript includes illuminations in red, blue, yellow, green and gold. Capital letters at the start of books of the bible and the chronicle are elaborately illuminated in several colours, sometimes taking up most of the page; 57 of these survive. The start of the Book of Genesis is missing. There are also 20 initials with the letters in blue, with vine decoration in red. With the exception of the portraits of the devil, an author portrait of Josephus, and a squirrel perched on top of an initial (f. 110v), the illuminations all display geometrical or plant-based forms, rather than human or animal forms. There are also two images representing Heaven and Earth during the Creation, as blue and green circles with respectively the sun, moon and some stars, and a planet all of sea with no landmasses. Within books, major capitals are much enlarged, taking up the height of about five to six lines of text, in red ink, and placed in the margins. Less important divisions, such as the start of verses, are slightly enlarged within the text and highlighted with yellowish ink around the letter forms.

The codex has a unified look as the nature of the writing is unchanged throughout, showing no signs of age, disease or mood on the part of the scribe. This may have led to the belief that the whole book was written in a very short time (see § Legend), but scientists are starting to investigate the theory that it took over 20 years to complete.

The length, size, and detail of the codex are of such extraordinary magnitude that legend surrounds its origin, specifically the story that it was written by one scribe in one night with help from the devil himself. It initially contained 320 sheets, though twelve of these were subsequently removed. It is unknown who removed the pages or for what purpose.

Illustration of the Devil 

Directly opposite the devil is a full page depiction of the kingdom of heaven, thus juxtaposing contrasting images of Good and Evil. The devil is shown frontally, crouching with arms uplifted in a dynamic posture. He is clothed in a white loincloth with small comma-shaped red dashes. These dashes have been interpreted as the tails of ermine furs, a common symbol of sovereignty. He has no tail, and his body, arms and legs are of normal human proportions. His hands and feet end with only four fingers and toes each, terminating in large claws; both his claws and large horns are red.

He has a large, dark green head, and his hair forms a skull cap of dense curls. The eyes are small, with red pupils, and his red-tipped ears are large. His open mouth reveals his small white teeth, and two long red tongues protrude from the corners of his mouth.

This doubling of tongues evokes negative associations with serpents, which have forked tongues, a metaphoric reference to dishonest human beings. The expression 'forked tongues' is an ancient one and is found in the Bible (Nordenfalk 1975, n. 15).

Several pages before this double spread are written in yellow characters on a blackened parchment and have a very gloomy character, somewhat different from the rest of the codex. The reason for the variation in coloring is that the pages of the codex are of vellum. Vellum, or scraped and dried animal hide, "tans" when exposed to ultraviolet light. Over centuries, the pages that were most frequently turned have developed this tell-tale darker color.

History 

According to legend, the Codex was created by Herman the Recluse in the Benedictine monastery of Podlažice near Chrudim in the Czech Republic. The monastery was destroyed some time in the 15th century during the Hussite Revolution. Records in the codex end in the year 1222. Shortly after it was written, it was pawned by the Benedictines to the Cistercian monks of the Sedlec Monastery, where it remained for 70 years. The Benedictine monastery in Břevnov reclaimed the bible around the end of the 13th Century. From 1477 to 1593, it was kept in the library of a monastery in Broumov until it was taken to Prague in 1594 to form a part of the collections of the Emperor Rudolf II.

At the end of the Thirty Years' War in 1648, the entire collection was taken as war booty by the Swedish army. From 1649 to 2007, the manuscript was kept in the Swedish Royal Library in Stockholm. The site of its creation is marked by a maquette in the town museum of Chrast.

On 7 May 1697, a fire broke out at the Tre Kronor royal castle in Stockholm, which destroyed much of the Royal Library. The Codex Gigas was thrown out of a window; according to the vicar Johann Erichsons, who wrote 50 years after the fire, it landed on and injured a bystander. In September 2007, after 359 years, the Codex Gigas returned to Prague on loan from Sweden until January 2008, and was on display at the National Library of the Czech Republic.

A National Geographic documentary included interviews with manuscript experts who argued that certain evidence (handwriting analysis and a credit to Hermann Inclusus – "Herman the Recluse") indicates the manuscript was the work of a single scribe.

Content 
The first page has two Hebrew alphabets. There are also added slips with Early Cyrillic and Glagolitic alphabets (Folio 1). About half of the codex (f. 1–118) consists of the entire Latin Bible in the Vulgate version, except for the books of Acts and Revelation, which are from a pre-Vulgate version. They are in the order: Genesis–Ruth; Isaiah; Jeremiah; Baruch; Lamentations; Daniel; Hosea–Malachi; Job; Samuel and Kings; Psalms–Song of Solomon; Wisdom of Solomon; Wisdom of Jesus; Chronicles; Esdras; Tobit; Judith; Esther; and Maccabees.

The two works by Josephus then continue the history of the Jews (f. 118–178). The first page of Josephus, which recounts the Genesis creation story, is illustrated in the margin with the pictures of Heaven and Earth (f. 118v). These works are followed by Isidore's Etymologiae (f. 201–239), and the medical works (f. 240–252). Following a blank page, the New Testament commences with Matthew–Acts, James–Revelation, and Romans–Hebrews (f. 253–286). This is followed by some pages with common prayers, and a page of "conjurations", "Three adjurations and two charms", some of them known from Jewish sources (f. 286–291). The full-page images of the Heavenly City and the devil are on f. 289–90 of this section. Then comes Cosmas of Prague's Chronica Boemorum (f. 294–304). A list of brothers in the Podlažice monastery, and a calendar with a necrology, magic formulae, the start of the introits for feasts, and other local records round out the codex (f. 305–312). 

Apart from the alphabets at the start, the entire book is written in Latin.

Legend 
According to one version of a legend that was already recorded in the Middle Ages, the scribe was a monk who broke his monastic vows and was sentenced to be walled up alive. In order to avoid this harsh penalty, he promised to create, in one night, a book to glorify the monastery forever, including all human knowledge. Near midnight, he became sure that he could not complete this task alone so he made a special prayer, not addressed to God but to the fallen angel Lucifer, asking him to help him finish the book in exchange for his soul. The devil completed the manuscript, and the monk added the devil's picture out of gratitude for his aid. In tests to recreate the work, it is estimated that reproducing only the calligraphy, without the illustrations or embellishments, would have taken twenty years of non-stop writing.

See also 
 List of New Testament Latin manuscripts
 List of Glagolitic manuscripts

References

Bibliography

Further reading 
 Bártl, S., Kostelecký, J.: Ďáblova bible. Tajemství největší knihy světa, Paseka, 1993. 
 J. Belsheim, Die Apostelgeschichte und die Offenbarung Johannis in einer alten lateinischen Übersetzung aus dem 'Gigas librorum' auf der königlichen Bibliothek zu Stockholm (Christiana, 1879).

External links 

  (complete Codex Gigas in medium resolution)

13th-century biblical manuscripts
13th-century illuminated manuscripts
Czech manuscripts
Illuminated biblical manuscripts
Vulgate manuscripts
World Digital Library